Shabrang is the legendary horse of the Persian hero Siyâvash in the Shahnameh. In a trial of his righteousness, Siyâvash passed through a large fire riding this stallion.  After his death, his son Kai Khosrow, eventually became the ruler of Persia and was among the most magnificent and benevolent rulers according to Shahnameh. He disappeared and in traditional Zoroastrian mythology, he never died and will return to bring justice riding on his father's horse Shabrang.

References

Sources
Ferdowsi Shahnameh. From the Moscow version. Mohammed Publishing. 

Persian legendary creatures
Shahnameh characters
Shahnameh stories
Horses in mythology